Valam-e Olya (also Romanized as Valam-e ‘Olyā; also known as Valam and Valam-e Bālā) is a village in Harazpey-ye Shomali Rural District, Sorkhrud District, Mahmudabad County, Mazandaran Province, Iran. At the 2006 census, its population was 285, in 72 families.

References 

Populated places in Mahmudabad County